Ermis Segatti (born November 24, 1937 in Pianezza, near Turin - Italy), is a Catholic theologian and university Professor belonging to the Archdiocese of Turin, Italy.

Biography
Ermis Segatti, after completing his theological training at the Catholic Seminary of Turin,  obtained a Laurea (Master's degree) in German Literature discussing Friedrich von Spee and German Religious Poetry in the 17th century, and another one in History of Christianity, concerning Church and State Inquisitorial Trial on Magic, from the University of Turin.
He is Professor of History of Christianity at the Theological University of Northern Italy - Turin Campus (Facoltà Teologica dell'Italia Settentrionale - Sezione Parallela di Torino). Until 2013 he was also a top administrator of the Archdiocese of Turin as Director of the Pastoral Office for the University and Culture.

Work
Ermis Segatti is a well known speaker at top academic and cultural events in Italy and abroad. Even recently he has been invited to lecture and establish contacts in Eastern Europe, in China, in South Asia and in Central America. He speaks English, French, German, Spanish, and Russian. He has  also a deep knowledge of the Latin Language and Literature that he taught for many years in public High Schools.
Professor Segatti has written several books and many academic and non academic articles in his fields of expertise.
In the past few years he has co-organized post-graduate professional development courses for people involved with ethics and bioethics issues.

Publications
Selected Books
Analisi marxista della religione, (Marxist Analysis of Religion), Editrice UPL, Torino, (1974)
Problemi di sociologia sovietica (1957–1962), (Problems of Soviet Sociology), Giappichelli (1975)
L'ateismo, un problema nel marxismo, (Atheism, a Problem in Marxism), Piemme (1986)
I cristiani e la pace, (Christians and Peace), Edizioni Gruppo Abele, Torino (1987)
Dopo 1000 anni di cristianesimo in Russia, (After 1000 Years of Christianity in Russia), Piemme (1989)
Anima, Viaggio nell'invisibile dell'uomo, (The Soul, Journey in the Invisible of Man), Piemme (2014)

Lectures
Islam e Cristianesimo (Islam and Christianity), collana  Per saperne di piu''', Edizioni Abbazia della Novalesa(1998)Teologie della liberazione in America Latina (Theologies of Liberation in Latin America), collana  Per saperne di piu', Edizioni Abbazia della Novalesa (1999)

Selected ArticlesFede e scienza: ripensando Galileo, in Scienza e tecnologia: al di là dello specchio, Libri Scheiwiller, Milano (2004), pp. 217–224.Il Cristianesimo come ascesi nella società del welfare e del debole pensiero, in L’ascesi nel Buddhismo e nel Cristianesimo, Atti del Convegno (12 giugno 2005),  Edizioni Agami (2005), pp. 93–100.Il primo articolo sulla Sindone nella rivista dell’ateismo scientifico sovietico, in  G.M. Zaccone- G. Ghiberti, Guardare la Sindone, Studia Taurinensia, Effatà Editrice (2007), pp. 418–426.Alla ricerca di un volto asiatico di Gesù, in Credere oggi, XXVII, 2, (2007), pp. 41–61.Stati e Chiese contro Satana: inquisizioni civili e religiose contro i delitti demoniaci tra Rinascimento e Illuminismo (States and Churches against the Devil: Civil  and Religious Inquisitions against Devil's Crimes between Renaissance and Enlightenment), in L'autunno del Diavolo, Vol. I, Bompiani, Milano 1990, pp. 405–433.
 当代哲学与天主教神学 (Contemporary Philosophy and Catholic Theology), published by the Beijing Institute for the Study of Christianity and Culture (BISCC), 2015

Essays published in Archivio teologico Torinese, (Theological Journal of Turin's Theological Faculty).
In EnglishThe Christological Thought of Michael Amaladoss, in Archivio Teologico Torinese,7, (2001/2), pp. 345–362.Neo-Platonism and Early Christian Theologies, in Archivio Teologico Torinese, 2, 2007, pp. 381– 422What does Augustine "acknowledge" and "recognize" in his Confessions?, 2, 2008, pp. 347–365Asian Christians in the First Millenium, 1, 2010, pp. 91–127
In ItalianTendenze del rinnovamento teologico in India. La ricerca su Dio. I: Premesse e precursori (Trends in Indian Theological Renewal), 5, 1999/1, pp. 125–158; II: I contemporanei (The Contemporaries), 5, 1999/2, pp. 125–158Il dibattito cristologico nella teologia Indiana. Preamboli neo-hindu e cristiani (The Christological Debate in Indian Theology. Neo-Hindu and Christian Premises), 9, 2004/1, pp. 110–132Alla ricerca di un volto asiatico di Gesu (The Quest for an Asian Profile of Jesus), in Credere oggi (Believing Today), XXVII, 2, 2007, pp. 41–61Parlare di laicita' con altre culture: in India e in Cina (Speaking of Laicity in Other Cultures: in India and in China), 1, 2012, pp. 70–87

See also

History of Christianity
Pontifical university

SourcesAnnuario della diocesi di Torino (2005)'' (Yearbook of the Archdiocese of Turin)
Official website of the Archdiocese of Turin

External links
Official website of the Theological University-Turin
Official website of the Archdiocese of Turin

1937 births
Living people
Clergy from Turin
20th-century Italian Roman Catholic priests
20th-century Italian Roman Catholic theologians
University of Turin alumni
Writers from Turin
21st-century Italian Roman Catholic theologians